Mamoudou Sy (born 1 April 1983 in Paris, France) is a French basketball player who played for French league Pro-A club Lyon-Villeurbanne during the 2003-2004 season.

References

1983 births
Living people
French men's basketball players
Junior college men's basketball players in the United States
Basketball players from Paris